Fahraj Rural District is in the Central District of Yazd County, Yazd province, Iran. At the National Census of 2006, its population was 22,659 in 5,303 households. There were 22,708 inhabitants in 6,207 households at the following census of 2011. At the most recent census of 2016, the population of the rural district was 34,511 in 9,696 households. The largest of its 14 villages was Chah Akrami, with 10,311 people.

References 

Yazd County

Rural Districts of Yazd Province

Populated places in Yazd Province

Populated places in Yazd County